PureBlack Racing was launched in July 2010, aiming to become New Zealand's first international UCI ProTour road cycling team. Olympians, professional athletes, business figures, politicians and government agencies from around the country showed strong support for the venture by attending the launch in Auckland.

Led by America's Cup yachtsman, Star Class World Champion and Olympian, Carl Williams, PureBlack Racing competed in UCI’s US Continental Tour in 2011 with the ultimate aim of becoming a ProTour Team with entry to the Tour de France by 2015. In December 2011, PureBlack Racing announced the team's proposed race program was in jeopardy due to lack of funding, and they were seeking further sponsorship.

Team PureBlack Racing grew out of Team Bici Vida, a domestic high performance cycling team, which Williams launched on his return from Valencia. From day one Williams’ vision was to build a world-class international cycle team in New Zealand, establishing it as a fully professional sports organisation.

Pro Roster 
As at 1st of January 2011

Development Roster

Major wins
2011
   Points classification Tour of Utah, Roman van Uden

References

External links
http://pureblackracing.com

UCI Continental Teams (Oceania)
Cycling teams based in New Zealand